Robert Christopher Battersby  (14 December 1924 – 30 September 2002)  was British soldier, linguist, diplomat and politician, who served as a Member of the European Parliament (MEP) for the constituency of Humberside between 1979 and 1989. He was a prominent member of the Conservative Party.

References

1924 births
2002 deaths
Alumni of Fitzwilliam College, Cambridge
Alumni of the University of Edinburgh
British Army personnel of World War II
Conservative Party (UK) MEPs
Intelligence Corps officers
MEPs for England 1979–1984
MEPs for England 1984–1989
People educated at Firth Park Academy
Politicians from Sheffield
Knights of St. Gregory the Great
Commanders of the Order of the British Empire